Entre Su Ritmo y el Silencio is the second posthumous compilation album by Colombian-American singer-songwriter Soraya. It was released in 2006 by EMI Music.

Track listing
 Como Sería
 El Otro Lado de Mi
 Miento
 Casi
 Alma de La Calle
 Sólo por Ti
 Prisonera 
 Ser
 Llévame
 Tiempo
 Ser Amado
 A Tu Lado
 Lead Me
 Dreaming of You

References

2006 greatest hits albums
EMI Records albums
Soraya (musician) albums